"If Everyone Cared" is a song recorded by Canadian rock group Nickelback. It was released in November 2006 as the sixth single from the album All the Right Reasons. It was released in Australia on November 13, 2006, and in the US on January 7, 2007. The song entered inside the top 40 on the ARIA Singles Chart on January 7, 2007. The song was then released in most other parts of the world in the beginning of 2007. It debuted at No. 50 on the Billboard Hot 100 in late January 2007, and climbed to No. 17. All the Right Reasons was the first Nickelback album to feature more than three top 20 singles in the United States. The song reached No. 1 on the Billboard Hot Adult Top 40 Tracks chart.

It was announced that 100% of all digital sales for the song will be donated to the charities of Amnesty International, and the International Children's Awareness Canada.

Music video
The video for the song was directed by Dori Oskowitz and produced by Justin Cronkite. It shows the band performing the song in a studio, interspersed with vintage footage and pictures representing famous world leaders. Those leaders are, in order: Bob Geldof, the founder of Live Aid, Betty Williams, a Nobel Peace Prize laureate, and Nelson Mandela, who ended the Apartheid movement in South Africa. Their stories are also shown in text during their respective scenes. Another scene focuses on the formation of Amnesty International. The video ends with the band finishing the song and packing up, which then cuts to more footage of Williams, followed by a quote from Margaret Mead.

Track listing
 "If Everyone Cared" (album version) – 3:38
 "Too Bad (acoustic)"
 "Someday (acoustic)"
 "If Everyone Cared (edit version)"

Personnel
 Chad Kroeger – lead and backing vocals, lead guitar
 Ryan Peake – rhythm guitar, backing vocals
 Mike Kroeger – bass
 Daniel Adair – drums
 Timmy Dawson – piano

Charts

Weekly charts

Year-end charts

Release history

References

Nickelback songs
2006 singles
Songs written by Chad Kroeger
Rock ballads
Song recordings produced by Joey Moi
Songs written by Mike Kroeger
Songs written by Ryan Peake
EMI Records singles
Roadrunner Records singles